The first cabinet of Hjalmar Branting was the cabinet of Sweden between 10 March 1920 and 27 October 1920.

It was the first social democracy based cabinet and a minority government. After that The Riksdag didn't pass the government's proposition concerning the reformation of the taxationsystem, they ordered two investigations, about industrial democracy and the socialisation of private companies (Socialiseringsnämnden).

In the general election, 1920 the Swedish Social Democratic Party lost 11 seats in the parliament. In the Riksdag the liberals were the weight between the Social Democratic Party and the Right party. In the general election, 1921 no party wanted to take over as government; so the king added a public administration, Cabinet of Louis De Geer, with Louis De Geer as prime minister.

Ministers and Ministries

|}

References

External links
The Government and the Government Offices of Sweden

Cabinets of Sweden
1920 establishments in Sweden
1920 disestablishments in Sweden
Cabinets established in 1920
Cabinets disestablished in 1920